The players listed  below have been officially named as captains and alternate captains of their American Hockey League (AHL) teams.

Key 
 Spent entire AHL career with team

Captains 
All thirty-two AHL teams currently have a captain.  Of the thirty-two captains, four of them have been with their team for their entire career.

Alternate captains 
All thirty-two AHL teams have named at least the regulation two alternate captains. Of the seventy-four alternate captains, eleven of them have been with their team for their entire career. Teams that have named more than the regulation two alternate captains (or three in the case of teams without a captain) are required to rotate the two (or three) "A"s between those players by methods of their choosing. The current longest-tenured alternate captains in the league are Ryan Wagner of the Colorado Eagles and Daniel Walcott of the Syracuse Crunch, who have served in those roles since 2017.

References 

 
American Hockey League lists
Ice hockey captains